Domingo Pérez de Granada is a village and municipality of Granada province, Spain, placed at 46 kilometers from Granada.

This village has many accesses: in the north, Montejícar and others villages of Jaén as Huelma, Cambil, and Arbuniel; In the east way is near to Píñar; and south access the old road to Granada, that joins it to Píñar, Iznalloz and Deifontes.

References

External links 
 Domingo Pérez de Granada in Google Maps

Municipalities in the Province of Granada
Populated places in the Province of Granada